The 1940–41 Georgetown Hoyas men's basketball team represented Georgetown University during the 1940–41 NCAA college basketball season. Elmer Ripley coached it in his fifth of ten seasons as head coach; it was also the third season of his second of three stints at the helm. For the first time, the team played its home games at Riverside Stadium in Washington, D.C. It finished the season with a record of 16-4 and had no postseason play.

Season recap

In its previous ten seasons, Georgetown had a combined record of 32 games under .500, and going into this season the Georgetown student yearbook, Ye Domesday Book, opined that the school would deemphasize or eliminate basketball by 1942 if the team's performance did not see significant improvement. The 1940–41 team rose to the yearbooks challenge, achieving the highest win total in history for a Georgetown men's basketball team.

Junior guard Buddy O'Grady returned for his second varsity season and led the team. He scored a season-high 14 points against Army.

Also starring for the team was sophomore center Bill Bornheimer. A strong defender, rebounder, and inside shooter, he led the team in scoring, averaging 8.4 points per game. Before 7,000 fans at Riverside Stadium – a record home crowd for a Georgetown basketball game – he had a season-high 15 points as the Hoyas upset Temple 57–49 on February 10, 1941.

Following a season-opening loss, the Hoyas won 11 games in a row and then five of their last eight, finishing with a record of 16–4. They narrowly missed invitations to the NCAA tournament and National Invitation Tournament and had no postseason play.

Roster
Sources

Two future Georgetown head coaches played on the team. Sophomore forward Ken Engles would leave school for World War II military service after the 1941-42 season, but would return to play for the 1945-46 team and also served as its head coach that season, the only player-coach in Georgetown men's basketball history. Junior guard Buddy O'Grady would coach the Hoyas from 1949 to 1952.

Junior guard Don Martin served as head coach at Boston College from 1953 to 1962.

1940–41 schedule and results
Sources

|-
!colspan=9 style="background:#002147; color:#8D817B;"| Regular Season

References

Georgetown Hoyas men's basketball seasons
Georgetown
Georgetown Hoyas men's basketball team
Georgetown Hoyas men's basketball team